The Stewart Motor Car Company was formed in March 1920 in Bowling Green, Ohio and announced plans to build several types of cars. Only one gasoline touring car prototype was built.  In 1922 an agreement was made to build the Coats Steam Car, with its operations located in Columbus moving to Bowling Green. The Stewart people called it the Stewart-Coats but only a pilot model was completed.

References
 David Burgess Wise, The New Illustrated Encyclopedia of Automobiles.

Defunct motor vehicle manufacturers of the United States
Motor vehicle manufacturers based in Ohio
Vintage vehicles
1920s cars
Steam cars

Vehicle manufacturing companies established in 1920
Vehicle manufacturing companies disestablished in 1922